Zone 4 is an American record label created as a joint venture between the producer Polow da Don and Interscope Records.

History
The label was launched in Atlanta, Georgia, on July 16, 2007. Polow started with four acts – Keri, Rich, YV and i-15 – and added a fifth act in 2008 – the YouTube/Myspace artist Dan Talevski. In July 2009, Ester Dean was added to the roster and in the fall Jared Evan was signed. Polow signed Roscoe-Dash in January 2010.

Talevski left Zone 4/Interscope in September 2011.

Polow is as the company's chairman. Mia A. Welsh (general manager), Krista Michalski (project manager) and Robert "Kaspa" Smith (marketing) oversee the daily business for Zone 4, Inc.

The label's first release was Rich Boy's first album, Rich Boy. Its second release was Keri Hilson's first album, In a Perfect World..., followed by Keri Hilson's second album, No Boys Allowed on December 17, 2010 and Lloyd's fourth album, King of Hearts, on July 5, 2011.

Artists

Current artists
Keri Hilson
Veronica Vega
Summerella

Former artists/producers
Chanel West Coast
Jared Evan
Lloyd
Rich Boy
Roscoe Dash
Mishon Ratliff
The Audibles
Exchange Student
I15
S. Fresh
KING
Betty Idol
Ayo & Teo
MDMA
Rocky Diamonds
Laron
Deonte
Chili Chil
Ester Dean 
Bando Jonez
Kane Brown

Discography

External links
Zone 4 inc website
Zone 4 inc Twitter page
Polow Da Don Twitter

References

Record labels established in 2007
American record labels
Labels distributed by Universal Music Group
Hip hop record labels
Contemporary R&B record labels